First Church Congregational is a historic church at Pleasant and Stevens Streets in Methuen, Massachusetts. The stone Gothic Revival structure was built in 1855 for Methuen's first congregation, established in 1729.  Its first meeting house was on Daddy Frye's Hill, but moved to the present location in 1832.  The present building features granite walls, a slate roof, and a tower with crenellated top and typical Gothic lancet windows.  In 1895 the church installed a stained glass representation of Christ's Resurrection designed by John LaFarge.

The church was individually listed on the National Register of Historic Places in 1978, and included in the Pleasant-High Historic District in 1984.  The current congregation is active in the United Church of Christ. The Rev. William D. Ingraham is its current Senior Pastor.

See also
 National Register of Historic Places listings in Methuen, Massachusetts
 National Register of Historic Places listings in Essex County, Massachusetts

References

External links

 First Church Congregational website

United Church of Christ churches in Massachusetts
Buildings and structures in Methuen, Massachusetts
Churches completed in 1855
19th-century United Church of Christ church buildings
Churches on the National Register of Historic Places in Massachusetts
Churches in Essex County, Massachusetts
Stone churches in Massachusetts
National Register of Historic Places in Methuen, Massachusetts
Historic district contributing properties in Massachusetts
Congregational churches in Massachusetts
Gothic Revival church buildings in Massachusetts